King Clone is thought to be the oldest creosote bush ring in the Mojave Desert. The ring is estimated to be 11,700 years old, making it one of the oldest living organisms on Earth.

Geography 
The King Clone ring is on restricted-access land in the central Mojave Desert, near the towns of Lucerne Valley and Landers. It is in the Creosote Rings Preserve of the Lucerne Valley and Johnson Valley.

Dating methodology 
King Clone was identified and the age estimated by Frank Vasek, a professor at the University of California, Riverside. After Vasek hypothesized that the creosote ring was, in fact, one organism, Leonel da Silveira Lobo O'Reilly Sternberg (then a graduate student working in Vasek's lab), documented that plants within a ring had more similar  characteristics than those from other plant clusters.  Vasek then used two methods to estimate the age of the ring.  One method counted rings and measured the distance of annual growth, and the other used radiocarbon dating on pieces of wood found in the center of the ring, and measuring their distances from each other and the living bushes. The two dating methods yielded similar results (age about 11,700 years).

Public appearances
This plant was in the 'Desert Worlds' episode of the David Attenborough TV series The Green Planet where he revisited the plant in 2022, after previously filming it in 1982. The plant had grown by less than one inch (25 mm) during this time.

See also 

 List of oldest trees
 Fairy ring

References

External links 
 National Park Service: Creosote Bush webpage
 Jepson Flora Project: Larrea tridentata

King
Natural history of San Bernardino County, California
Individual plants
King
Larrea
Natural history of the Mojave Desert
Larrea tridentata
Symbols of California
Oldest organisms